Chenaruiyeh (also Romanized as Chenārū’īyeh, Chenārrū’īyeh, and Chenārūyeh; also known as Chenar) is a village in Tujerdi Rural District, Sarchehan District, Bavanat County, Fars Province, Iran. At the 2006 census, its population was 650, in 145 families.

References 

Populated places in Sarchehan County